In August 1999, the United States Postal Service issued a set of 33¢ postage stamps entitled All Aboard! 20th Century American Trains to "pay tribute to American industry and design, and specifically to the heritage of our railroads." Artist Ted Rose created five watercolor images depicting the following celebrated American named passenger trains from the 1930s and 1940s:  

 the Congressional of the Pennsylvania Railroad;
 the Daylight of the Southern Pacific Railroad;
 the Hiawatha of the Chicago, Milwaukee, St. Paul and Pacific Railroad;
 the Super Chief of the Atchison, Topeka and Santa Fe Railway; and
 the 20th Century Limited of the New York Central Railroad.

Descriptive text regarding each of the trains was listed on the gummed side of each stamp.

At the same time, the USPS offered for sale a booklet of "20 U.S. Postal Service Ready-To-Mail Stamped Postal Cards" which contained four sets of the five paintings.

References

External links
 All Aboard! 20th Century American Trains 1999 USPS Stamp Program

Further reading 
Anthony J. Bianculli. Railroad History on American Postage Stamps. Astragal Press, 2004. 1931626200

Postage stamps of the United States
Atchison, Topeka and Santa Fe Railway
Chicago, Milwaukee, St. Paul and Pacific Railroad
New York Central Railroad
Pennsylvania Railroad
Southern Pacific Railroad
Trains in art